Young Professionals in Foreign Policy (YPFP) is a United States nonprofit, nonpartisan organization that works to train the next generation of foreign policy leadership. The group was founded by Joshua Marcuse in 2004.

Membership
YPFP's membership spans 80 countries and a network of over 20,000 young professionals active in the field of foreign policy. Members are screened and selected from a broader pool of applicants and each pay membership dues to support organizational programming and services. Members are drawn from a variety of global institutions, government agencies, nonprofits, media groups, graduate programs, and corporations that span a diverse array of sectors.

Chapters
Washington D.C., London, Brussels, New York, San Francisco, Toronto, and Tokyo comprise YPFP's core branches, while hubs in Rome and Tel Aviv provide a global network of interconnection and dialogue.

Discussion groups
YPFP's discussion groups are peer-led communities within YPFP that offer selected members an opportunity to connect with other young professionals who share a depth of experience in a particular region or subject. Discussion groups involve issues around Africa, Arabic Language, Chinese Language, Combating Terrorism, Cybersecurity Policy & Technology, Defense, East Asia, Energy & Environment, Europe & Eurasia, French Language, Gender in Foreign Policy, Grand Strategy, Human Rights, Intelligence and Information Warfare, International Development, International Trade & Finance, Latin America, Middle East, Nuclear Weapons, Russian Language, South Asia, and Spanish Language.

Fellowship program
The fellowship program at YPFP is an eight-month fellowship designed to give future leaders in foreign policy the skills they will need to succeed throughout their careers. Fellows develop their expertise by writing regular articles for a variety of national and international media outlets, such as The Hill, Diplomatic Courier, and Real Clear Politics. Fellows specialize in a specific region or a specific issue area.

FPFP also receives grant funding for projects from foundations across the United States.

Charged Affairs
Charged Affairs is the flagship publication of YPFP and a showcase of perspectives by rising leaders in foreign policy. It is a journal designed to give young professionals a chance to hone their writing and analytical skills by participating in a rigorous editorial process and to present insightful and creative articles to the broader foreign policy community.

References

External links
 Young Professionals in Foreign Policy
 Huffington Post YPFP Blog Posts
  Fulbright Blog
 Twitter

Educational charities based in the United States
Foreign policy
Clubs and societies in Washington, D.C.